Te Puke  is a town located 18 kilometres southeast of Tauranga in the Western Bay of Plenty of New Zealand. It is particularly well known for the cultivation of Kiwifruit.

Te Puke is close to Tauranga, Mount Maunganui, Papamoa, and Maketu, which are all coastal towns/cities, as well as the small townships of Waitangi, Manoeka, Pongakawa, and Paengaroa. The Tauranga Eastern Link, completed in 2015, moved State Highway 2 away from Te Puke and removed large volumes of traffic from its streets.

The town's name comes from the Māori language, and should be pronounced "teh-pook-ee", not "te-pyook".  It translates to the hill; it is on a hill near the Papamoa Hills.

Demographics

Te Puke had a population of 8,688 at the 2018 New Zealand census, an increase of 1,296 people (17.5%) since the 2013 census, and an increase of 1,728 people (24.8%) since the 2006 census. There were 2,793 households, comprising 4,368 males and 4,326 females, giving a sex ratio of 1.01 males per female, with 1,809 people (20.8%) aged under 15 years, 1,893 (21.8%) aged 15 to 29, 3,423 (39.4%) aged 30 to 64, and 1,569 (18.1%) aged 65 or older.

Ethnicities were 62.2% European/Pākehā, 26.5% Māori, 4.8% Pacific peoples, 19.4% Asian, and 1.6% other ethnicities. People may identify with more than one ethnicity.

The percentage of people born overseas was 24.6, compared with 27.1% nationally.

Although some people chose not to answer the census's question about religious affiliation, 42.2% had no religion, 30.9% were Christian, 3.4% had Māori religious beliefs, 2.6% were Hindu, 0.3% were Muslim, 0.9% were Buddhist and 13.0% had other religions.

Of those at least 15 years old, 783 (11.4%) people had a bachelor's or higher degree, and 1,638 (23.8%) people had no formal qualifications. 570 people (8.3%) earned over $70,000 compared to 17.2% nationally. The employment status of those at least 15 was that 3,363 (48.9%) people were employed full-time, 1,023 (14.9%) were part-time, and 276 (4.0%) were unemployed.

History and culture

Settlement 
Around 1350, the Te Arawa canoe is said to have landed at Maketu after sailing from Hawaiki. The canoe was under the command of chief Tama-te-kapua, and he was responsible for many of the original place names of the area. Māori ventured up the rivers and streams and built many pā in the area.

Lieutenant, later Captain James Cook, the first European known to visit the area, sailed between Motiti Island and the coast in 1769. This was his first voyage to New Zealand, but he did not land here. Cook named the area the Bay of Plenty as he observed that it was well populated and looked very fertile. In 1830 Danish sailor Philip Tapsell, also known as Hans Homman Felk, settled at Maketu and operated as a trader. Church Missionary Society (CMS) missionaries arrived shortly afterwards and established mission stations at Te Papa (Tauranga) and at Rotorua. After the land wars began to ease in the 1860s, European settlers began to move to the Bay of Plenty though not in great numbers.

Maketu, however was a thriving village with a school, post office, and hotel and in 1869 an Anglican church.  In 1876, surveying of the Te Puke Block commenced but it was not until 1879 that they survey was completed as the Native Land Court needed to complete their investigation of Māori titles for the land. Demand for land in the Tauranga area increased and the Tauranga Working Men's Land Association was formed in 1877. Forty eight members  petitioned the government for 4000 acres (16 ha) of the Te Puke block under the deferred-payment system.  At the same time George Vesey Stewart applied to the government to bring settlers from Great Britain to the Te Puke Block as he had already successfully done in Katikati.

The first settlers on the Te Puke Block arrived in 1879 and included Peter Grant and his wife Caroline (née Moon), William Bird and his wife Sarah (née Leitch), Joseph Malyon and his wife Sara (née James) amongst others. The first of the Vesey Stewart settlers arrived in Tauranga directly from London on the Lady Jocelyn on 2 January 1881.

Development
In July 1880, work commenced on the Tauranga to Te Puke Road, via Welcome Bay. It was constructed  by the Armed Constabulary and local Māori who worked on their land. Before this, access to Te Puke was made across the Papamoa Hills from Ngapeke to Manoeka, following an ancient Māori trail. Peter Grant had been contracted by the Tauranga County Council to form this track into a bridle path in 1879.

Stores and passengers for the town could also come from Tauranga by boat, first to Maketu, then up the Kaituna River to Canaan Landing and then by Māori canoe up the Waiari Stream to the site of the present road bridge just to the south of the town.

By late 1881, Te Puke boasted 25 wooden buildings including two hotels, two general stores, a butcher, a post office and a smithy. The settlers quickly settled upon the land and by 1884 had established a butter factory. Draining of the swamps began and the area was found to be very suitable for crops, and maize and wheat were grown extensively. Later much of the farming land was found to be "bush sick" but was cured with the use of cobalt in the 1930s.

Flax milling had begun in the 1870s and became a major industry in the area until the early 1940s.  Saw milling began in 1905 and is still a major industry in the area. In 1883 gold-bearing ore was discovered on the Papamoa Hills and during the 1920s a gold mine operated at Muir's farm on No 4 Road.  With the building of the railway a large Public Works quarry operated in Te Puke and was a major employer. The freezing works at Rangiuru opened in 1968 and HortResearch opened on No 1 Road in 1971.

Disaster struck in the early hours of the 10 June 1886 with the eruption of Mount Tarawera. Te Puke residents were awoken with the noise and the many related earthquakes. Many had a good view of the eruption and paintings survive of their memories. Ash and mud showered over crops and pastures up to 12 inches deep in places. The sun was not seen until 1pm.

Stock faced starvation and many farmers were forced to let their animals free to fend for themselves. Some stock was shipped from the area but many died. The settlers became short of food and water themselves and help was gratefully received from Tauranga. Evidence of the Tarawera eruption can still be found in disturbed ground in the area today. (Te Puke was again covered in ash during the 1995 Mount Ruapehu eruption though not to the same scale.)

Te Puke town-ship began to grow and a mission/town hall was built in 1883. This was used for town meetings and as a church by three of the congregations. The first school, (Te Puke Primary) was opened in 1883. The Te Puke Times was first printed in 1912. The fire brigade and town boards were both formed in 1913.

A jockey club was formed in 1890, the brass band in 1903, the A. & P. Society in 1905, the rugby union in 1906, the bowling club in 1908, and the golf club in 1912. Planting of the trees down the centre of the main street, a major feature of the town today, began during 1914-1918 as a war memorial to the fallen. A nursing home was opened in Boucher Avenue in 1918 but any major cases were railed to Tauranga Hospital.

Railway 

The East Coast Main Trunk Railway passes through Te Puke and opened in 1928. Rail passenger services were provided by the Taneatua Express which operated between Auckland and Taneatua between 1928 and 1959. In February 1959, the steam hauled express train service was replaced by a railcar service operated by 88 seaters that only ran as far as Te Puke. The railcar service operated between 1959 and 1967, when it was cancelled due to both mechanical problems with the railcars and poor patronage, the latter largely due to the circuitous and time-consuming rail route between Auckland and the Bay of Plenty at that time.

Horticulture 

A combination of the climate and soils in the area has always made Te Puke a popular area for horticulture. From the 1880s tobacco was grown commercially but petered out in the late 1930s. Trial plantings of hops, and later rice, were also tried. Viticulture was also tried and found to be successful but for various reasons also died out. The settlers had established home orchards when finance permitted and it was found that pip and citrus fruits flourished. From this, the first commercial orchard in Te Puke was planted in 1915. Commercial plantings were of apples, pears, oranges, lemons and grapefruit. After World War Two, the Rehabilitation Department settled returned servicemen on the No 3 Road as orchardists. Followed by others with their own finance, most of No 3 Road was in orchards by 1960.

In 1934 Jim MacLoughlin had bought a  lemon and passionfruit orchard in No 3 Road. His neighbour Vic Bayliss had two Chinese gooseberry plants and he had sold the fruit for £5. Spurred on by this Jim planted ½ acre of Chinese gooseberries in 1937. During World War II, American serviceman in New Zealand were introduced to the Chinese gooseberry and enjoyed it so much that this spurred further plantings. In 1952 the first exports were made, and in 1959 the name “Kiwifruit” was introduced. Since then many more plantings have been made with Hayward (green) being the most popular. In 1998 “Zespri Gold” kiwifruit was introduced to the market and experiments are being carried out on new varieties including a peelable kiwifruit and "kiwiberry", a small bite-sized kiwifruit-like fruit.

Marae

There are five marae in Te Puke, affiliated with local iwi and hapū:

Haraki Marae and meeting house are affiliated with Waitaha and the Ngāti Rangiwewehi hapū of Ngāti Rangiwewehi ki Tai.

Makahae - Te Kahika Marae is affiliated with the Tapuika hapū of Ngāti Tuheke.  In October 2020, the Government committed $4,525,104 from the Provincial Growth Fund to upgrade the marae and nine others, creating an estimated 34 jobs.

Manoeka Marae and Hei meeting house are affiliated with Waitaha.

Moko - Ngāti Moko Marae and the Mokotangatakotahi meeting house are affiliated with the Tapuika hapū of Ngāti Moko.

Tawakepito Marae and Tawakepito meeting house is affiliated with the Tapuika hapū of Ngāti Tuheke.

Economy

Agriculture is the backbone of the district's economy. The warm, moist climate and fertile soils are favourable for horticulture, with production of kiwifruit, avocados and citrus fruit such as lemons and oranges. The town markets itself as the "Kiwifruit capital of the world". Dairy cattle and other livestock are also farmed.

Today, Te Puke is a thriving town with a reasonably large main shopping street, Jellicoe Street, which is also the main road passing through Te Puke. There are a number of schools, religious organisations, cultural groups, and a variety of clubs in the town.

A large number of residents work picking or packing kiwifruit during April or May, as well as others coming from other nearby towns and cities. It can swell past 10,000 some seasons.

Education

References

External links

Western Bay of Plenty District Council
Te Puke Page on Sooty's Home Page: historical information and archives
Historic photos of Te Puke on Timeframes - Alexander Turnbull Library, National Library of New Zealand

Western Bay of Plenty District
Populated places in the Bay of Plenty Region